The Wham of Sam is a 1961 studio album by Sammy Davis Jr., arranged by Marty Paich and Morty Stevens.

Reception

The Allmusic review by Lindsay Planer awarded the album four stars and said that Davis' "untouchable sense of rhythmic flair unleashes some lighthearted interaction between the vocalist and hard-driving instrumentalists.".

Track listing
 "I'm a Fool to Want You" (Joel Herron, Frank Sinatra, Jack Wolf) – 3:28
 "Back in Your Own Backyard" (Dave Dreyer, Al Jolson, Billy Rose) – 2:49
 "Lush Life" (Billy Strayhorn) – 3:45
 "I'm Gonna Live Till I Die" (Mann Curtis, Al Hoffman, Walter Kent) – 3:09
 "(Love Is) The Tender Trap" (Jimmy Van Heusen, Sammy Cahn) – 2:35
 "Out of This World" (Harold Arlen, Johnny Mercer) – 3:19
 "Bye Bye Blackbird" (Mort Dixon, Ray Henderson) – 2:47
 "Thou Swell" (Richard Rodgers, Lorenz Hart) – 2:59
 "Can't We Be Friends?" (Paul James, Kay Swift) – 2:53
 "Blame it on My Youth" (Edward Heyman, Oscar Levant) – 4:14
 "Let There Be Love" (Ian Grant, Lionel Rand) – 2:49
 "Soon" (George Gershwin, Ira Gershwin) – 2:48

Personnel 
Sammy Davis Jr. – vocals
Marty Paich - arranger, conductor
Morty Stevens and his orchestra
Jimmy Mitchell - double bass
Joe Mondragon
Armand Kaproff - cello
Raphael Kramer
Edgar Lustgarten
Kurt Reher
Mel Lewis - drums
Shelly Manne
Vincent DeRosa - french horn
Tony Rizzi - guitar
Larry Bunker - percussion
Jimmy Rowles - piano
Ronnie Lang - alto saxophone
Bud Shank
Bill Hood - baritone saxophone
Buddy Collette - tenor saxophone
Dave Pell
Bill Perkins
Frank Howard - trombone
Dick Nash
Dick Noel
Kenny Shroyer
Lloyd Ulyate
Stu Williamson
Frank Beach - trumpet
Don Fagerquist
Ollie Mitchell
Al Porcino
Uan Rasey
Jack Sheldon
Red Callender - tuba
Sam Freed - violin
Anatol Kaminsky
Erno Neufeld
Lou Raderman

References

1961 albums
Sammy Davis Jr. albums
Albums arranged by Marty Paich
Albums produced by Jimmy Bowen
Reprise Records albums
Albums conducted by Marty Paich